William von Raab (January 26, 1942 – February 20, 2019) was an American attorney who served as Commissioner of the United States Customs Service from 1981 to 1989.

He died on February 20, 2019, in Charlottesville, Virginia at age 77.

References

1942 births
2019 deaths
Commissioners of the United States Customs Service
Virginia Republicans